This article is a list of countries by cremation rate. Cremation rates vary widely across the world. As of 2019, international statistics report that countries with large Buddhist populations like Bhutan, Cambodia, Hong Kong, Japan, Myanmar, Nepal, Tibet, Sri Lanka, South Korea, and Thailand have a cremation rate ranging from 80% to 99%, while Roman Catholic majority-countries like Italy, France, Ireland, Latvia, Poland, Spain, and Portugal report much lower rates. Factors include both culture and religion; for example, the cremation rate in Muslim, Eastern Orthodox, Oriental Orthodox, and Roman Catholic majority-countries is much lower due to religious sanctions on the practice of cremation, whereas for Hindu, Jain, and Buddhist majority-countries the cremation rate is much higher. However, economic factors such as cemetery fees, prices on coffins and funerals greatly impel towards the choice of cremation.

Africa

Zimbabwe
Cremation is still considered taboo in Zimbabwe, but the practice is not forbidden. The Bulawayo City Council, the second largest city in the country, planned mandatory cremation for those that died before the age of 25. However, this plan was cancelled after many protests from Pentecostal Christian groups.

South Africa 
The rate of cremation is about 12% in Cape Town, which has a significant White population, but it is lower in other parts of the country.

Ghana
There is a crematorium in Accra, the capital of Ghana, but the cremation rate is low. Pentecostal Christians, which constitute the largest religious group in the country, are officially against cremation.

Kenya
Nairobi has the only crematorium in Kenya. Since Kenya is a Christian-majority country, the opposition against cremation largerly derives from Christian beliefs about the practice.

Nigeria
Cremation is legal in the Lagos State of Nigeria.

Asia

China
The People's Republic of China reported 4,534,000 cremations out of 9,348,453 deaths (a 48.50% rate) in 2008. The cremation rate was 45.6% for 2014, according to the Chinese Ministry of Civil Affairs.

India

Dharmic religions originated in ancient India. Almost all people adhering to Hinduism, Buddhism, Jainism, and Sikhism choose cremation as the traditional method of disposal of the dead, which makes the Republic of India one of the countries with the highest cremation rate in the world. However, different Indigenous peoples of India follow various funerary practices, which include cremation, inhumation, or both methods.

Japan
Japan has one of the highest cremation rates in the world, with the country reporting a cremation rate of 99.97% in 2019.

Nepal
Almost everyone adhering to Hinduism and Buddhism cremates their dead, which makes Nepal one of the countries with the highest rate of cremation. The rate of cremation is around 95%.

Singapore
Given its tiny land area, Singapore has one of the highest cremation rates in the world, reporting a cremation rate of 80.54% in 2018.

South Korea
South Korea had the cremation rate of 92.1% in 2022. It is increasing as people born later are more likely to be cremated.  About 94 percent of those under the age of 60 were cremated, with 99 percent of those in their 20s being cremated in 2014.

Taiwan
According to information from Ministry of Interior, the cremation rate was 92.47% in 2013, 144,162 of the 155,908 deaths that year.

Europe

United Kingdom
The cremation rate in the United Kingdom has been increasing steadily with the national average rate rising from 34.70% in 1960 to 77.05% in 2017.

Nordic countries
Cremation rates in the Nordic countries vary from Norway's 36% to Finland's 61% in 2021, Sweden's 70% and Denmark's 76%. In all countries the cremation rate in large towns is generally between 70% and 90%.

Netherlands
The first cremation in the Netherlands was performed in 1914. In the hundred years since the cremation rate has risen to 63% in 2014.

Belgium
The cremation rate in Flanders has increased from a little over 50% in 2010 to 74% in 2020.

France
Cremation remains a minority practice in rural France where burial places are available, but is increasingly common in urban areas. In 1979 just 1% of funerals involved cremation: in 2012 it was 32%, rising to 45% in Paris.

Ireland 
Cremation has been on the increase in Ireland in the last decade. This is largely due to both the expense of burial plots and their (lack of) availability. In 2017, almost 20% of deaths in Ireland involved cremation. There are five crematoria in Ireland, three of which are located in Dublin (Glasnevin (the first facility of its type in Ireland, established in 1982), Newland's Cross, Harold's Cross), one in Cavan and one in Cork. However, access to these cremation facilities is not restricted to people living in Dublin or Cork. Anyone may arrange for a cremation to take place in any of these crematoria. Another crematorium opened in Shannon in 2017.

Spain 

Cremations are booming in Spain: in 2006, just 16% of deaths involved cremation, but by 2016 that figure had risen to 36%. Around half of all deceased are cremated in Barcelona. In 2019, the total number of deaths was 417,000, of which 44% were cremated.

Portugal
The first crematorium in Portugal opened in 1925, but was closed in 1936. In 1985, it was reopened. Currently (2018 data), 20% of the deceased in Portugal are cremated. In 2005 that figure only reached 4.2%. In the country's capital, Lisbon, the number of incinerations reaches 54%.

Hungary
Cremation recently became more popular than burial in Hungary: in 1996, the cremation rate was 27%, and in 2016, it was around 60%, with 70–90% in Budapest.

Russia 
The first crematorium in Russia was built in Vladivostok in 1917, primarily for the cremations of Japanese people, who had a big population in this city. Later, the Donskoy crematorium was built in Moscow in 1927 and remained the only crematorium in the USSR until 1972, when the Nikolo-Archangelskiy crematorium in Moscow was commissioned. In 2021, there are 27 crematoriums in Russia.

The highest rate of cremations is in Moscow and Saint-Petersburg at about 50–70% of all deaths. In other large cities it is 20–25%, while the total cremation rate in Russia is about 10%. The reason for such a low prevalence of cremation is the mentality of Russians, which is influenced by religious beliefs - the Russian Orthodox Church has a negative attitude towards cremation, while Islam categorically prohibits it.

North America

Canada
The cremation rate in Canada has been increasing steadily with the national average rate rising from 5.9% in 1970 to 68.4% in 2009. The rates vary greatly among the provinces with the most recent (1999) province level statistics showing that British Columbia had the highest rate at 74% while Prince Edward Island had the lowest rate at 8.5%.

The projected Canadian rates for 2010:

United States

The cremation rate in the United States has been increasing steadily, with the national average rate rising from 3.56% in 1960 to 53.1% in 2018. Projections from the Cremation Association of North America forecast a rate of 59.4% in 2023. The rates vary considerably among the states with the highest rates (over 70%) being reported in the Western United States with the lowest rates (under 30%) being reported in the Southern United States.

A survey by the Funeral and Memorial Information Council found that Americans increasingly choose cremation for the cost savings. In 1990, 19 percent reported this motivation; in 2010, one-third reported this motivation.

The following table lists the 2014 cremation rate for each state and the District of Columbia including the national average.

The National Funeral Directors Association had a slightly different national cremation rate in the United States, reporting a 2016 rate of 50.2 percent, with this expecting to increase to 63.8 percent by 2025 and 78.8 percent in 2035.

South America
Cremation rates vary from 2.16% in Colombia to 25.41% in Argentina.

Oceania

Australia
The Cremation Society (UK) states that the cremation rate in Australia in 2018 was slightly over 69% of all deaths.

New Zealand
New Zealand's rate is slightly higher than Australia's, with a cremation rate in 2018 of 75% of all deaths.

See also

 Antyesti
 Burial at sea
 Burial in space
 Cremation in Japan
 Death
 Promession
 Resomation
 Sati
 Self-immolation
 Tissue digestion

References

External links
 Welcome - International Cremation Federation Official webpage

Cremation
Cremation
Cremation